Jannatabad (also Romanized as Jannatābād; also known as Jannatābād-e Gonbagī) is a village in Gonbaki Rural District, Gonbaki District, Rigan County, Kerman Province, Iran. At the 2006 census, its population was 406, and is composed of 95 families.

References 

Populated places in Rigan County